Vaishali is a restaurant popular in Pune for  southern Indian food.   It is located on Ferguson College Road. It was established in 1951 by Jagannath B Shetty, as Madras Health Home. It is known mainly for South Indian dishes.

In popular culture 
Vaishali was mentioned in U n Me... It's Complicated!  a novel by Aditya Nighot.

References

Restaurants in India
Culture of Pune